Zambezi Airlines was a privately owned airline headquartered in Lusaka, Zambia, that operated flights to south and western Africa out of its base at Kenneth Kaunda International Airport.

History
Zambezi Airlines began operations in July 2008. The airline first operated an Embraer 120. In May 2009, it acquired two Boeing 737-500. In June 2009, operations to Johannesburg, South Africa, and Dar es Salaam, Tanzania, commenced. In the same month, the airline was authorized by the Zambia Competition Commission to form an alliance with Proflight Commuter Services.

On 1 November 2011, the airline licence of Zambezi Airlines was suspended because of safety issues. Subsequently, the airline was dismantled in 2012.

Destinations

Johannesburg - OR Tambo International Airport
Cape Town - Cape Town International Airport

Dar es Salaam - Julius Nyerere International Airport

Nairobi - Jomo Kenyatta International Airport

Lilongwe - Lilongwe International Airport

Harare - Harare International Airport

Lubumbashi - Lubumbashi International Airport

Lusaka - Kenneth Kaunda International Airport, hub
Ndola - Ndola Airport

Fleet
Upon shutdown, the Zambezi Airlines fleet included the following aircraft:

References

External links

Airlines formerly banned in the European Union
Defunct airlines of Zambia
Airlines established in 2008
2008 establishments in Zambia
Airlines disestablished in 2012
Companies based in Lusaka